Adrián de Lemos Calderón (born 13 October 1982 in Goicoechea, Costa Rica) is a Costa Rican professional football goalkeeper who currently plays for Deportivo Guastatoya.

Club career
De Lemos made his professional debut for Herediano on 25 August 2002 against Santos de Guápiles. In January 2005 he moved to Brujas on loan in order to get more playing time and he duly returned to Herediano in summer 2006. In summer 2010 he joined Pérez Zeledón.

In December 2012, Saprissa snapped him up ahead of the 2013 clausura only to lose him a year later to Santos de Guápiles.

De Lemos joined Antigua in the summer 2017. Two years later, he joined  Deportivo Guastatoya ahead of the 2019/20 season.

International career
De Lemos made his debut for Costa Rica in an October 2003 friendly match against South Africa and earned a total of 6 caps, scoring no goals. He missed out through a knee injury on the 2004 Summer Olympics and was part of the Costa Rica preliminary squad for the 2006 World Cup.

His final international was a September 2010 friendly match against Panama.

References

External links

1982 births
Living people
People from San José Province
Association football goalkeepers
Costa Rican footballers
Costa Rica international footballers
C.S. Herediano footballers
Brujas FC players
Municipal Pérez Zeledón footballers
Deportivo Saprissa players
Santos de Guápiles footballers
C.S. Cartaginés players
Antigua GFC players
C.D. Guastatoya players